Graça Maria da Fonseca Caetano Gonçalves (born 13 August 1971) is a Portuguese politician who served as Minister of Culture in the government of Prime Minister António Costa . Fonseca graduated with a law degree from the University of Lisbon, has a master's degree in economics from the University of Coimbra, and obtained a PhD in sociology from ISCTE – University Institute of Lisbon. From 26 November 2015 to 15 October 2018, Fonseca served as Secretary of State Assistant and of Administrative Modernisation.

When she came out publicly, in an interview to newspaper Diário de Notícias in 2017, she was the first gay member of a government cabinet ever to disclose their sexual orientation in Portugal. Since taking office as Minister of Culture in 2018, she is the first openly gay Portuguese government minister.

In July 2020, when asked by a reporter about the pressure cultural workers were facing due to the COVID-19 pandemic, instead of responding to the question, she said she had to leave for a late-afternoon drink, using an anglicism that some critics considered insensitive.  Her response was widely panned by the Portuguese press.

References

1971 births
Living people
Portuguese politicians
Culture ministers of Portugal
Women government ministers of Portugal
People from Lisbon
Lesbian politicians
Portuguese LGBT politicians
Portuguese lesbians